Palungtar Airport  also known as Gorkha Airport, was an airport serving the municipalities Palungtar and Gorkha of Gorkha District in the Southern region of Gandaki Province of Nepal.

History
The airport was originally opened in October 1960. it is currently out of operation, for which the District of Gorkha has no active airport as of 2018. It used to serve as a main tourist gateway to the former royal city of Gorkha and its palaces, but lost importance after the area received road connectivity, namely Prithivi Highway. Despite out of operation, the airport served as a major landing site for helicopters distributing relief material after the Gorkha earthquake in 2015.

Facilities

Former airlines and destinations

Until 1979, Nepal Airlines operated several routes from the airport.

References

Defunct airports in Nepal
Buildings and structures in Gorkha District
Airports established in 1960
1960 establishments in Nepal